Saint-Hilaire-de-Riez is a railway station in Saint-Hilaire-de-Riez, Pays de la Loire, France. The station is located on the Commequiers–Saint-Gilles-Croix-de-Vie railway. The station is served by TER (local) services operated by the SNCF:
local services (TER Pays de la Loire) Nantes - Sainte-Pazanne - Saint-Gilles-Croix-de-Vie

References

TER Pays de la Loire
Railway stations in Vendée